The 1947–48 British Ice Hockey season featured the English National League and Scottish National League.

English National League

English Autumn Cup

Results

English National Tournament

Results

Scottish National League

Eastern Section

Western Section

Playoffs
Semifinals
Dundee Tigers - Ayr Raiders 4:1, 6:1
Dunfermline Vikings - Paisley Pirates 8:0, 7:2
Final
Dundee Tigers - Dunfermline Vikings 1:0, 7:7

Scottish Cup

Results
First round
Falkirk Lions - Dunfermline Vikings 9:4 on aggregate (5:1, 4:3) 
Glasgow Bruins - Perth Panthers 12:3 on aggregate (7:2, 5:1)
Paisley Pirates - Dundee Tigers 9:5 on aggregate (4:4, 5:1) 
Fife Flyers - Ayr Raiders 14:9 on aggregate (10:5, 4:4)
Semifinals
Falkirk Lions - Fife Flyers 17:8 on aggregate (12:2, 5:6) 
Paisley Pirates - Glasgow Bruins 20:5 on aggregate (6:2, 14:3)
Final
Paisley Pirates - Falkirk Lions 6:3 on aggregate (3:1, 3:2)

Simpson Trophy

Results
Semifinals
Dundee Tigers - Ayr Raiders 17:11 on aggregate (13:8, 4:3)
Dunfermline Vikings - Perth Panthers 18:8 on aggregate (8:4, 10:4)
Final
Dunfermline Vikings - Dundee Tigers 15:10 on aggregate (6:7, 9:3)

Canada Cup

Results

References 

British
1947 in English sport
1948 in English sport
1947–48 in British ice hockey
1947 in Scottish sport
1948 in Scottish sport